Harold Charles Papworth OBE (1888–1953) was a British educator and officer of the Indian civil service who served as the Principal of the Presidency College, Madras from 1934 to 1942.

Early life 

Papworth was born in India on 16 December 1888. After his education, Papworth entered the Indian educational service in which he served until December 1943.

Career 

Papworth was appointed Principal of the Presidency College, Madras in 1934 and served till 1942. Papworth also served as the Vice-Chancellor of Travancore University from 1947 to 1949. In 1941, Papworth was made an officer of the Order of the British Empire.

Family 

Papworth married Gladys Emily Muirhead (1887–1965) on 26 February 1916. The couple had a daughter called Yvonne (born 1917).

Notes 

1888 births
1953 deaths
Officers of the Order of the British Empire
Academic staff of Presidency College, Chennai
British people in colonial India